Second Marriage Dot Com is a 2012 Hindi-language film directed by Gaurav Panjwani, art direction by Priyanka Agarwal, Segment Editing & VFX by Rahul Sharma  featuring Mohit Chauhan, Vishal Nayak, Charu Rahtogi and Sayani Gupta in the lead roles. The film is produced by Vinod Mehta under the banner of Vin Mehta Films Pvt Ltd. and was released on 10 August 2012.

Plot
The film kicks off when Akshay, a young IT professional from Delhi and only child of single parent Suneel Narang, embarks on a journey to get his father, a widower, married so to finally put an end to his prolonged loneliness. Coincidentally in Jaipur, a vibrant young girl, Poonam, is on the same hunt to find a partner for her mother, Shoma, whom she's seen as a divorcee since childhood. They get in touch with each other through a matrimonial website named 'secondmarriage.com' and after their parents' initial denial, they finally marry.

Poonam and Shoma then join Akshay and Suneel in a new adequate flat in Gurgaon. A distinguished family scenario arises for the four, filled with a new cook hailing from a rustic background, Bihaari and a north-eastern maid Flower. Suneel and Shoma are not at ease with each other to start with, but gradually sparks begin to fly. Poonam and Akshay who had become good friends from the start, and who themselves are lonely souls with bitter memories, are happy to discover a feeling which had always eluded them – the joy of a family.

Poonam and Akshay find themselves in love with each other after a night of irrepressible emotions which results in an inconceivable event; the happiness of the four goes for a toss. The story takes sharp turns and explores dark zones of the human psyche before the characters finally square up for an unaccustomed but fairly logical solution to their situation.

Cast
 Mohit Chauhan as Suneel
 Charu Rahtogi as Shoma
 Vishal Nayak as Akshay
 Sayani Gupta as Poonam

 Kanisha Malhotra as Nikita
 Akhilendra Mishra
 Ankit Sharma as Veeja

 Amit Mistry
 Mustaq Khan
 Arun Verma
 Rajat Rawail

 Anita Mudgal as Seeta
 Pankaj Sharma as Lakshman
 Mohit Baghel as Waiter

Reception

Soundtrack
The soundtrack is composed by Mannan Munjal and Aditya Agarwal. The music has received generally positive reviews with songs like Manchala, Barsaat, Kamli and Balam receiving positive reviews. Balam is sung by Rekha Bharadwaj.

References

External links
 

2012 films
2010s Hindi-language films